Joseph Donovan may refer to:

 Joseph Donovan (producer), music producer, engineer, and musician
 Joseph Donovan (boxer) (1949–2001), indigenous Australian boxer
 Joseph L. Donovan (1893–1985), Minnesota politician
 Joseph R. Donovan Jr., American diplomat